Renat Heuberger (born 18 December 1976) is the co-founder and CEO of South Pole, a carbon finance consultancy. He has been engaged as a social entrepreneur in the fields of sustainability, climate change and renewable energies since 1999.

Before founding South Pole, Heuberger co-founded and acted as the CEO of the myclimate foundation.

Heuberger holds a Master's in Environmental Sciences from the Swiss Federal Institute of Technology and completed the Social Entrepreneur Programme, ISEP, at INSEAD and Executive Education at Harvard Kennedy School (HKS).

Professional life
After working for development organisation Swisscontact in Indonesia, Heuberger co-founded the World Student Community on Sustainable Development, as well as the platform for interdisciplinary projects Seed Sustainability. In 2002, he founded the Swiss myclimate foundation, a non-profit climate protection organisation that was inspired by a successful initiative to compensate the greenhouse emissions of flights of attendees at the annual meeting of the Alliance for Global Sustainability in Costa Rica. Heuberger acted as myclimate's CEO until 2006.

He has also  supported the UNFCCC process regularly chairing and presenting at official side events on topics such as "Sustainable CDM - Best Practice" at CoP 11/MoP 1 of the UNFCCC in Montreal and "What has carbon trade taught us about ecological markets?" at CoP 16/MoP 6 of the UNFCCC Cancun Summit. Heuberger presented his Shifting Fortunes insight at the 2013 WEF in Davos.

Awards and recognition
South Pole won the title of Best Project Developer in a peer-voted industry ranking by Environmental Finance between 2011-17 and enabling the first-ever issuance of Gold Standard certificates, the first issuance of SOCIALCARBON-certified carbon credits in Southeast Asia  and, with his colleague Christian Dannecker, the first Voluntary Carbon Standard forestry project in South America.

Heuberger has also initiated with colleague Maximilian Horster the first climate credit card in Switzerland and the first carbon screener application on the Bloomberg Terminal that allows investors and asset managers to calculate the carbon footprint of every investable company around the world. The investment carbon footprinting business was successfully incubated and later sold to a large financial industry player, ISS, in 2017.

Positions of trust
Heuberger was elected Swiss Social Entrepreneur 2011 by the World Economic Forum’s Schwab Foundation, along with Christoph Sutter, and received the sustainability award in 2013 by the Zurich Cantonal Bank (ZKB). In 2014, Heuberger was elected as Member of the Global Agenda Council on Climate Change of the World Economic Forum.

Heuberger currently serves as a board member of  Climate-KIC, Europe's largest public-private innovation partnership on climate change and is a member of the Innovation Council of  InnoSuisse] the Swiss Innovation Agency. He is also a member of the Advisory Board of the  Impact Hub Zurich, a platform for social entrepreneurship, and a member of the Expert Network of the World Economic Forum.

Bibliography

Heuberger R: “Mexico’s Clean Development Mechanism Potential”, Mexico Energy & Sustainability Review, p. 216 ff., 2014
Heuberger R: “Transparenz im Strommarkt – wie kann die Marktliberalisierung zur Energiewende beitragen?” aus Tobias Reichmuth (Hrsg.) 2014: die Finanzierung der Energiewende in der Schweiz. Bestandsaufnahme, Massnahmen, Investitionsmöglichkeiten. NZZ Libro: Zürich, S. 69 f., 2014
Heuberger R.: 'Der globale CO2-Handel nach der Klimakonferenz in Cancun, Umweltrecht in der Praxis' URP 2010 365, S. 821 f., 2010
Heuberger Renat, Brent Alan, Santos, Luis, Sutter Christoph, Imboden Dieter, "CDM Projects under the Kyoto Protocol: A Methodology for Sustainability Assessment – Experiences from South Africa and Uruguay", "Environment, development and sustainability : a multidisciplinary approach to the theory and practice of sustainable development", Springer, 2007. 
Heuberger R, Thomas F, "Quality standards for micro-climate protection projects""Qualitäts-Standards für Mikro-Klimaschutz-Projekte", Umwelt-Fokus, 2004.
Renat Heuberger, Alan Brent, Luis Santos, Christoph Sutter, Dieter Imboden, "Evaluating projects that are potentially eligible for Clean Development Mechanism (CDM) funding in the South African context: A case study to establish weighting values for sustainable development criteria", ETH, 2003.

References

External links 
 South Pole

Swiss businesspeople
Social entrepreneurs
Living people
1976 births